Triplophysa altipinnis is a species of stone loach in the genus Triplophysa. It is endemic to China.

References

Kottelat, M., 2012. Conspectus cobitidum*: an inventory of the loaches of the world (Teleostei: Cypriniformes: Cobitoidei). The Raffles Bulletin of Zoology, Suppl. (26):1-199.

altipinnis
Freshwater fish of China
Endemic fauna of China
Taxa named by Artem Mikhailovich Prokofiev
Fish described in 2003